The 36th Infantry Brigade was an infantry brigade formation of British Army that fought in the First World War, as part of 12th (Eastern) Division, on the Western Front. The brigade also fought in the Second World War, with the 12th (Eastern) Infantry Division, in France, and later with 78th Infantry Division in Tunisia and Italy.

First World War
The 36th Brigade fought throughout the First World War with the 12th (Eastern) Division on the Western Front. During the First World War the brigade was part of the New Army, also known as Kitchener's New Armies, and disbanded after the war ended.

Order of battle
 8th (Service) Battalion, Royal Fusiliers (City of London Regiment) (disbanded February 1918)
 9th (Service) Battalion, Royal Fusiliers (City of London Regiment)
 7th (Service) Battalion, Royal Sussex Regiment
 11th (Service) Battalion, Duke of Cambridge's Own (Middlesex Regiment) (disbanded February 1918)
 36th Machine Gun Company, Machine Gun Corps (formed 1 February 1916, moved to 12th Battalion, Machine Gun Corps 1 March 1918)
 36th Trench Mortar Battery (formed 15 June 1916)
 5th (Service) Battalion, Princess Charlotte of Wales's (Royal Berkshire Regiment) (from February 1918)

Second World War

Reformed during the Second World War as the 36th Infantry Brigade on 7 October 1939, this time as part of the Territorial Army, and attached to the 12th (Eastern) Infantry Division, duplicate of the 44th (Home Counties) Infantry Division. The brigade was formed as a 2nd Line duplicate of the 132nd (Kent) Infantry Brigade. It fought in the Battle of France in May 1940 where it was overrun by the German Army and dispersed and suffered very heavy casualties, due mainly to the division having none of its support units and the infantrymen having had little training. Reformed in the United Kingdom, it was redesignated 36th Independent Infantry Brigade from 22 June 1940, when the 12th Division was disbanded, until 22 June 1942 when it was assigned to the 78th Battleaxe Infantry Division and served in the North African Campaign, in Operation Husky and the Italian Campaign, in particular the Battle of Monte Cassino and later Gothic Line, followed by the Spring 1945 offensive in Italy.

Order of battle
The 36th Infantry Brigade was constituted as follows during the war:
 2/6th Battalion, East Surrey Regiment (left 26 October 1939)
 6th Battalion, Queen's Own Royal West Kent Regiment
 7th Battalion, Queen's Own Royal West Kent Regiment (until 20 August 1942)
 5th Battalion, Buffs (Royal East Kent Regiment) (from 26 October 1939)
 36th Infantry Brigade Anti-Tank Company (formed 18 August 1940, disbanded 20 June 1941)
 8th Battalion, Argyll and Sutherland Highlanders (from 21 August 1942)
 181st Field Ambulance, Royal Army Medical Corps (from 10 December 1941 until 22 June 1942)

Commanders
The following officers commanded the brigade during the war:
 Brigadier G.R.P. Roupell (until 20 May 1940, MIA)
 Brigadier A.L. Kent-Lemon (from 1 July 1940 until 17 December 1942)
 Brigadier B. Howlett (from 17 December 1942, KIA 29 November 1943)
 Lieutenant Colonel P.E.O. Bryan (Acting, from 30 November to 3 December 1943)
 Brigadier J.L. Spencer (from 3 December 1943 until 2 May 1944)
 Brigadier J.G. James (from 2 May 1944, KIA 16 June 1944)
 Brigadier C.D. Packard (from 27 June until 20 December 1944)
 Brigadier G.R.D. Musson (from 20 December 1944 until 7 June 1945)
 Lieutenant Colonel A.J. Odling-Smee (Acting, from 7 June until 11 July 1945)
 Brigadier G.R.D. Musson (from 11 July 1945)

Recipients of the Victoria Cross
 Corporal George Jarratt, 8th (Service) Battalion, Royal Fusiliers, Great War
 Lieutenant Colonel Neville Elliott-Cooper, 8th (Service) Battalion, Royal Fusiliers, Great War

References

Bibliography
 

Infantry brigades of the British Army in World War I
Infantry brigades of the British Army in World War II